Code of the Northwest is a 1926 American silent Western film directed by Frank S. Mattison and starring Tom London, Frank Austin and Shirley Palmer.

Synopsis
In Canada a Mountie is assisted by his police dog to bring in a wanted man.

Cast
 Sandow the Dog as Sandow
 Richard Lang as Sgt. Jerry Tyler
 Tom London as Pvt. Frank Stafford
 Frank Austin as Sandy McKenna
 Shirley Palmer as Lorna McKenna
 Billy Franey as Posty McShanigan
 Eddie Brownell as Clay Hamilton
 Loraine Lamont as Jeanie McKenna
 Jack Richardson as Donald Stafford

References

Bibliography
 Munden, Kenneth White. The American Film Institute Catalog of Motion Pictures Produced in the United States, Part 1. University of California Press, 1997.

External links
 

1926 films
1926 adventure films
1926 Western (genre) films
American black-and-white films
American adventure films
Films directed by Frank S. Mattison
Associated Exhibitors films
Chesterfield Pictures films
Films set in Canada
Silent American Western (genre) films
1920s English-language films
1920s American films
Silent adventure films